Dupré is a French name that literally means "from the meadow ("pré" in french)" , or "from Prez". Also existing variants are Duprée, DuPree, Deupree, DePrez, Dupres, Duprez, Düpre and Du Preez.

French

 Augustin Dupré (1748–1833), engraver
 Guy Dupré (born 1928), French writer
 Jos Dupré (1928–2021), Belgian politician
 Jules Dupré (1812–1889), painter
 Marcel Dupré (1886–1971), musician
 Marie Jules Dupré (1813–1881), French admiral. governor of Réunion and Cochinchina
 Melissa Dupré (born 1986), athlete
 Louis Dupré (1697–1774), ballet dancer, ballet master and ballet teacher
 Xavier Dupré (born in 1977), Graphic designer and Type designer

Italian
 Giovanni Duprè (1817–1882)  Italian sculptor

British
 John Dupré (born in 1952), philosopher of science
Jacqueline du Pré (1945-1987), cellist

French Canadian
 Emile Duprée (born in 1936), wrestling promoter
 René Duprée (born in 1983),  Emile Dupré's son, also a wrestling promoter
 Marc Dupré, humorist and musician

American
 Anna Johnson Dupree (1891–1977), Texas businesswoman and philanthropist
 Ashley Alexandra Dupré, stage name of the former prostitute connected to the Eliot Spitzer prostitution scandal
 Billy Joe DuPree, American football player
 Bud Dupree, American football player
 Chauntelle DuPree, Garron DuPree, Sherri DuPree, Stacy DuPree, and Weston DuPree, members of the band Eisley
 Champion Jack Dupree, (1909 or 1910–1992) US-American blues pianist
 Cornell Dupree, (1942–2011) US-American jazz and R&B guitarist
 Jermaine Dupri, record producer
 Jesse James Dupree, singer of American rock band Jackyl
 Louis Dupré (philosopher), Catholic phenomenologist and religious philosopher
 Louis Dupree, Afghanistan scholar
 Nancy Hatch Dupree, Afghanistan scholar
 Nick Dupree (1982–2017), American disability rights activist and writer
 Louis George Dupree, (1932–2001), American football player
 Malachi Dupre (born 1995), American football player
 Marcus Dupree, American football player
 Minnie Dupree, (1873–1947) American stage and screen actress
 Taylor Deupree, musician
 Thomas Ludger Dupré, American Catholic Bishop

South African 
French Huguenot families came to South Africa fleeing the persecution in 17th century France caused by the revocation of the Edict of Nantes in 1685. Amongst them was Hercule Des Prez and his family that left for South Africa aboard the ship "Die Schelde" on 19th of February 1688. Through time the surname has changed to "Du Preez". The surname Du Preez is a fairly well known in South Africa and is a typical Afrikaans surname.

Frik du Preez (born 1925), former South African rugby union player
Fourie du Preez (born 1982), former South African rugby union player
Mignon du Preez (born 1989), female South African cricketer

Fictional characters
 Dupre, a character in the Ultima series of computer games
 You, Me and Dupree, a comedy film

Music
 Robbie Dupree, American singer best known for his 1980 pop hit "Steal Away"
 "Dupree's Paradise" is Frank Zappa's song
 "Mitzi Dupree", a song by British rock band Deep Purple from their album The House of Blue Light
 Champion Jack Dupree, American musician
 Cornell Dupree, American guitarist
 Jacqueline DuPre, English cellist
 Paul Dupré, American composer of classical music
 Simon Dupree and the Big Sound English band of the 1960s best known for their psychedelic single Kites.
 "Cousin Dupree", a song on Steely Dan's 2000 album Two Against Nature
 "Dupree's Diamond Blues" is a song by The Grateful Dead that tells a crime story. It is based on a real case.

French toponymic surnames